Sarduy is a surname. Notable people with the surname include:

Maydenia Sarduy (born 1984), Cuban archer
Severo Sarduy (1937–1993), Cuban poet, writer, playwright, and critic